Phil Johnstone (1 September 1957 – 31 May 2021) was an English songwriter, keyboardist, guitarist, and record producer, best known for his work with singer Robert Plant. His songwriting credits include Plant's number-one Mainstream Rock hits "Heaven Knows", "Tall Cool One" and "Hurting Kind (I've Got My Eyes on You)".

Biography 
Johnstone first worked with Plant on the 1988 album Now and Zen,
which Johnstone co-produced. Johnstone co-wrote most of the songs on the album; he also wrote songs for Plant's follow-up albums Manic Nirvana (1990) and Fate of Nations (1993).

Following his work with Plant, Johnstone wrote songs for singer Alannah Myles' 1995 album A-lan-nah.
Recorded and produced Freeborn John by Rev Hammer 1996 on Cooking Vinyl. Johnstone also co-wrote the whole of The Levellers' 2000 album Hello Pig. Johnstone also headed the popular all-star musical festival act, "The Fabulous Good Time Party Boys", which featured members of the Levellers, Irish singer/songwriter Dan Donnelly, American musician Roy Harter, and two of his children, Alex Johnstone and Emily Johnstone.

Death
Johnstone died on 31 May 2021 at the age of 63, after a few years of bad health. His funeral service was held on 2 July at St James' Parish Church in Exeter.

References

Living people
English rock keyboardists
English rock guitarists
English male guitarists
English songwriters
English record producers
1957 births
People from Hitchin
Musicians from Hertfordshire
British male songwriters